Cteniza is a small genus of Old World trapdoor spiders found in France and Italy, first described by Pierre André Latreille in 1829. , it contains only three species: C. genevieveae, C. moggridgei, and C. sauvagesi.

References

Ctenizidae
Mygalomorphae genera
Spiders of Europe
Taxa named by Pierre André Latreille